This is a list of the Danish Singles Chart number-one hits of 1995 from the International Federation of the Phonographic Industry and Nielsen Soundscan. They were provided through Billboard magazine under the "Hits of the World" section.

Chart history

See also
1995 in music

References

1995 in Denmark
1995 record charts
Lists of number-one songs in Denmark